Beli Dunav Metro Station is a station on the Sofia Metro in Bulgaria. It opened on 31 August 2012. Bulgaria's PM Boyko Borisov and the President of the European Commission Jose Manuel Barroso inaugurated the new section of the Sofia Metro, which was funded with EU money.

Interchange with other public transport
 Tramway service: 6
 City Bus service: 87, 108, 285

Location

Gallery

References

External links

 Sofia Metropolitan
 More info in Bulgarian
 Park and Ride at the station
 vijsofia.eu

Sofia Metro stations
Railway stations opened in 2012
2012 establishments in Bulgaria